This is a list of the woredas, or districts, in the Sidama Region of Ethiopia.

List of districts
 Aleta Chuko
 Aleta Wendo
 Arbegona
 Aroresa
 Hawassa Zuria
 Bensa
 Bona Zuria
 Boricha
 Bursa
 Chere
 Dale
 Dara
 Gorche
 Hawassa
 Hula
 Loko Abaya
 Malga
 Shebedino
 Wensho
 Wondo Genet

See also
Districts of Ethiopia

References

Sidama Region
Districts